Skakun is a Ukrainian surname. Notable people with this surname include:
 Andriy Skakun (born 1994), Ukrainian footballer
 Nataliya Skakun (born 1981), Ukrainian weightlifter
 Oleksandr Skakun (born 1973), Ukrainian politician
 Sergei Skakun (born 1970), Belarusian tennis player
 Vitalii Skakun (1996–2022), Ukrainian military engineer

See also
 

Belarusian-language surnames
Ukrainian-language surnames